Paulo Alho is a race car driver born in Sesimbra, Portugal on 26 December 1980. He spent three years in Formula Nissan 2000, debuting in 2000, and before that three years in Portuguese Formula Ford. He also spent part of 1999 in Portuguese Formula BMW.

See also
Outline of auto racing

References

External links

1980 births
Living people
Portuguese racing drivers
People from Sesimbra
Sportspeople from Setúbal District